Advanced d20 Magic is a sourcebook published by Guardians of Order in 2006 that contains variant rules for the third edition of the fantasy role-playing game Dungeons & Dragons.

Description
Spellcasters in Dungeons & Dragons and other d20 System role-playing games use a "fire & forget" system of magic first described in the Dying Earth stories and novels of sf author Jack Vance. In the Vancian system, the spellcaster must memorize a spell to use it. Once the spell has been cast, it fades from the spellcaster's memory, forcing the spellcaster to rememorize the spell. 

Advanced d20 Magic uses a variant system of spellcasting for D&D and other d20 role-playing games. The variant system, called "Dynamic Spellcasting", allows spellcasters to cast any spell they know as often as they wish as a standard action without any special ingredients or other actions. However, spellcasting can drain a spellcaster's physical resources to the point of unconsciousness.

Publication history
Guardians of Order, producers of the Big Eyes Small Mouth (BESM) role-playing game based on Japanese manga, also created a d20 role-playing game based on Slayers (2003), a Japanese novel series written by Hajime Kanzaka and illustrated by Rui Araizumi. Rather than the Vancian "fire & forget" system of spellcasting used in other d20 role-playing games, this system used a variant called "Dynamic Spellcasting".

In 2006, Guardians re-published Slayers "Dynamic Magic" system as a variant for D&D and other d20 game systems in Advanced d20 Magic, a 144-page softcover book designed by David Lyons and Michelle Lyons, with interior art by Kythera, Anne Rouvin, and Melissa Uran, with cover art by Niko Geyer.

Recognition
A copy of Advanced d20 Magic is held in the Judith Merril Collection of Science Fiction, Speculation & Fantasy (Toronto Public Library).

References

External links 
RPG.net Review of Advanced d20 Magic.
Gamewyrd Page on Advanced d20 Magic
Enworld Review of Advanced d20 Magic.
RPGnet
RPGGeek

D20 System
Guardians of Order games